Brad E. Leithauser (born February 27, 1953) is an American poet, novelist, essayist, and teacher. After serving as the  Emily Dickinson Lecturer in the Humanities at Mount Holyoke College and visiting professor at the MFA Program for Poets & Writers at the University of Massachusetts Amherst, he is now on faculty at the Johns Hopkins Writing Seminars.

Biography
Leithauser was born in 1953 in Detroit, Michigan. He is an alumnus of the Cranbrook School in Bloomfield Hills, Michigan and a graduate of Harvard College and Harvard Law School. He worked for three years as a research fellow at the Kyoto Comparative Law Center in Japan. Leithauser has lived in Japan, Italy, England, Iceland, and France. He was married to the poet Mary Jo Salter for many years (they divorced in December 2011) and previously taught at Mount Holyoke College. In January, 2007, Leithauser joined the faculty of Johns Hopkins University in Baltimore, Maryland.

Leithauser's work has appeared in The New York Times, The New York Review of Books, Time, The New Yorker, and The New Criterion.

He is on the editorial board of the literary magazine The Common, based at Amherst College.

Leithauser is the uncle and godfather of Hamilton Leithauser, lead singer of The Walkmen.

Awards and grants
 Ingram Merrill Foundation Grant
 MacArthur Fellowship
 1982 Guggenheim Fellowship
 1984 Younger Poets Award from Academy of American Poets
 Medal of the Order of the Falcon (awarded by the President of Iceland)

Bibliography

Poetry collections
 Hundreds of Fireflies Knopf, 1982, 
 Cats of the Temple, Knopf, 1986, 
 The Mail from Anywhere, Knopf, 1990, 
 The Odd Last Thing She Did, Alfred A. Knopf, 1998,

Novels
 Equal Distance, Knopf, 1985; New American Library, 1986, 
 Hence, Knopf, 1989
 Seaward, Knopf, 1993
 The Friends of Freeland, A.A. Knopf, 1997, 
 
 Darlington's Fall: A Novel in Verse, Alfred A. Knopf, 2002, 
 The Art Student's War, Random House Digital, Inc., 2009, 
 The Promise of Elsewhere, Alfred A. Knopf, 2019,

Essay collections
 Penchants and Places, A.A. Knopf, 1995

Edited volumes
 The Norton Book of Ghost Stories (1994)

Anthologies

References

External links
 Married Poets Craft Love Poems by the Clock
 Brad Leithauser in The New York Times
 Brad Leithauser in The New Criterion
 "A Good List", The New Criterion, October 2006
 “A science fiction writer of the Fifties”, April 2006
 Brad Leithauser in The Atlantic
 Brad Leithauser in The New Republic
 Brad Leithauser in The New York Review of Books
 Brad Leithauser web index at Knopf
 Leithauser in The New Yorker
 Leithauser Review of Marianne Moore collection

1953 births
Living people
20th-century American novelists
21st-century American novelists
American male novelists
Formalist poets
Cranbrook Educational Community alumni
Harvard Law School alumni
Johns Hopkins University faculty
MacArthur Fellows
Mount Holyoke College faculty
Writers from Detroit
Recipients of the Order of the Falcon
University of Massachusetts Amherst faculty
20th-century American poets
21st-century American poets
American male poets
American male essayists
20th-century American essayists
21st-century American essayists
20th-century American male writers
21st-century American male writers
Novelists from Maryland
Novelists from Massachusetts
Novelists from Michigan
Harvard College alumni